The Carmen Thyssen Museum (Museo Carmen Thyssen Málaga) is an art museum in the Spanish city Málaga. The main focus of the museum is 19th-century Spanish painting, predominantly Andalusian, based on the collection of Carmen Cervera, fifth wife of Baron Hans Heinrich Thyssen-Bornemisza.

Since 1992 the Thyssen family's art collection has been on display at the Thyssen-Bornemisza Museum in Madrid.
However, Carmen Thyssen has been an art collector in her own right since the 1980s, and her personal collection is shown separately.
In 1999, she agreed to display many items from her collection in the Thyssen-Bornemisza Museum for a period of twelve years. Meanwhile, a home for her collection was sought in Málaga. This museum, a conversion of a sixteenth-century building, opened to the public on 24 March 2011.

Building
The purpose-built museum was developed by RG Arquitectos Asociados around the 16th century Baroque Palacio de Villalón, which was partly reconstructed on this occasion. The exhibition spaces, three rooms for the permanent collection and two for temporary exhibitions, were newly built next to the palace, which houses the Old Masters collection. Overall, the museum covers 7,147 square metres, of which 5,185 can be used to display art.

Highlights of the collection
Niccolò Frangipane, Penitent, 1574 
Francisco de Zurbarán, Saint Marina, c. 1640-1650 
Alfred Dehodencq, A Confraternity in Procession along Calle Génova, 1851 
Marià Fortuny, Bullfight. Wounded Picador, c. 1867
Manuel Ussel de Guimbarda, Rosquillo Sellers in Seville, 1881
Guillermo Gómez Gil, The Reding Fountain; By the Fountain, c.1880-1885
Raimundo Madrazo, Leaving the Masked Ball,  c. 1885
Martín Rico Ortega, A Summer's Day on the Seine, 1870-1875
Emilio Sánchez-Perrier, Winter in Andalusia, c. 1880
Ignacio Zuloaga, Bullfight at Éibar, 1899
Darío de Regoyos, The Concha, Night-time, 1906
Francisco Iturrino, The Bath (Seville), 1908
Ramon Casas i Carbó, Julia, 1915  
Julio Romero de Torres, La Buenaventura, 1922

Gallery

Notes

Art museums established in 2011
2011 establishments in Spain
Modern art museums in Spain
Museums in Málaga